Beach water polo at the 2008 Asian Beach Games was held from 19 October to 22 October in Tanjung Benoa, Bali, Indonesia. Only four teams entered the competition.

Medalists

Results

Preliminaries

Final round

3rd place match

Final

References
 Official site

External links
OCA official website

2008 Asian Beach Games events
Asian Beach Games
2008